Chalita Suansane (born 24 December 1994) is a Thai model, actress and beauty pageant titleholder from Samut Prakan. On 23 July 2016, she won Miss Universe Thailand 2016 and represented Thailand at Miss Universe 2016.

Early life
Chalita was born in Nonthaburi, Thailand, but moved to Samut Prakan, Thailand as a child. Her mother, Chutikan Suansane, who is of Thai-German descent and originally from Nakhon Si Thammarat, is a King Power's employee. She currently lives in Bangkok, Thailand and has previously worked as a commercial model.

Chalita graduated from secondary school at Poolcharoenwittayakom School. She previously studied at the Faculty of Science & Microbiology at Mahasarakham University but in the year 2017, she transferred from her original institution to study at the Faculty of Science & Microbiology at Srinakharinwirot University. Later, in 2019, she changed her major to a new field, acting and film.

Pageantry

Miss Universe Thailand 2016
Chalita was crowned Miss Universe Thailand 2016 on 23 July 2016 at the Royal Paragon Hall in Bangkok by outgoing titleholder Aniporn Chalermburanawong. She was studying Microbiology when her sister sent an application for her in the Miss Universe Thailand competition last July  2016. This was Chalita's first ever beauty pageant.

Miss Universe 2016
She represented Thailand at the Miss Universe 2016 pageant in the Philippines where she won the fan vote Miss Universe 2016. She placed at top 6.

Filmography

Television series

Sitcom

References

External links
Miss Universe Thailand website
 
 

Chalita Suansane
1994 births
Living people
Chalita Suansane
Chalita Suansane
Miss Universe 2016 contestants
Chalita Suansane
Chalita Suansane
Chalita Suansane
Chalita Suansane